The black-browed greenbul (Arizelocichla fusciceps) is a species of the bulbul family of passerine birds.  It is found in south-eastern Africa from south-western Tanzania to north-eastern Zambia, Malawi and west-central Mozambique.

Taxonomy and systematics
The black-browed greenbul was originally described in the genus Xenocichla (a synonym for Bleda) and then classified in Andropadus. It was re-classified to the new genus Arizelocichla in 2010. Some authorities have considered the Uluguru greenbul to be a subspecies of the black-browed greenbul. Alternate names for the black-browed greenbul include the black-browed mountain greenbul, Morogoro yellow-necked greenbul, northern mountain greenbul and southern mountain greenbul.

References

black-browed greenbul
Birds of Sub-Saharan Africa
Birds of East Africa
black-browed greenbul